Melaleuca linearifolia, commonly known as netted bottlebrush, is a plant in the myrtle family, Myrtaceae and is endemic to New South Wales in Australia. (Some Australian state herbaria continue to use the name Callistemon linearifolius). It is a shrub with narrow, pointed leaves and red flower spikes in spring or summer.

Description

The flowers are red to dark crimson and arranged in spikes on the ends of branches which continue to grow after flowering and also on the sides of the branches.

Taxonomy and naming
Melaleuca linearifolia was first formally described in 2006 by Lyndley Craven in Novon.  The specific epithet (linearifolia) is from the Latin words linearis meaning "linear" and folium meaning "a leaf" in reference to the shape of the leaves of this species.

Distribution and habitat
Melaleuca linearifolia occurs on the coast of New South Wales from Nelson Bay to the Georges River, where it grows in dry sclerophyll forest near sandstone.

Conservation status
Melaleuca linearifolia has been classified as "vulnerable" by the New South Wales Government.

References

linearifolia
Flora of New South Wales
Plants described in 2006
Taxa named by Lyndley Craven